Pollen's vanga (Xenopirostris polleni) is a species of bird in the family Vangidae. It is endemic to eastern Madagascar. Its natural habitats are subtropical or tropical moist lowland forests and subtropical or tropical moist montane forests. It is threatened by habitat loss.

References

Pollen's vanga
Pollen's vanga
Taxonomy articles created by Polbot
Fauna of the Madagascar lowland forests
Fauna of the Madagascar subhumid forests